This is a list of Marathi (Indian Marathi-language) films that are scheduled to release in 2023.

Box office collection
The highest-grossing Marathi films released in 2023, by worldwide box office gross revenue, are as follows.

January – March

April – June

July – September

October – December

See also
 List of Marathi films of 2022

References 

2023
2023 in Indian cinema
 
Marathi